The 2014 Haringey Council election took place on 22 May 2014 to elect members of Haringey Council in England. This was on the same day as other local elections.

Labour retained control of the council, winning 14 seats from the Liberal Democrats to increase their majority from 11 seats to 39 seats. In total, Labour won 48 seats (+14) and the Lib Dems won 9 seats (-14). No other parties were represented on the council.

Summary of results

Ward results

Alexandra

Bounds Green

Bruce Grove

Crouch End

Fortis Green

Harringay

Highgate

Hornsey

Muswell Hill

Noel Park

Northumberland Park

Seven Sisters

St Ann's

Stroud Green

Tottenham Green

Tottenham Hale

West Green

White Hart Lane

Woodside

By-Elections

A by-election for Woodside was called following the death of Cllr Pat Egan.

A by-election for Noel Park was called following the resignation of Cllr Denise Marshall.

A by-election for Woodside was called following the death of Cllr George Meehan.

The by-election was triggered by the resignation of Councillor James Ryan

A by-election for St Ann's was called following the resignation of Cllr Peter Morton.

References

Haringey
2014